España station is a railway station located on the South Main Line in the city of Manila, Philippines. It derives its name from its location in España Boulevard.

The station is the third station for trains headed south from Tutuban.

Nearby landmarks

Major landmarks near the station include the University of Santo Tomas, Dominican School Manila, the Ramon Magsaysay High School, the Legarda Elementary School, and the España Tower.

Transportation links
España station is served by buses, jeepneys, and UV Express which ply routes along España Boulevard. Cycle rickshaws also serve the vicinity around the station.

Reconstruction
The station will be reconstructed as part of the PNR Calamba section of the North–South Commuter Railway.

References

Philippine National Railways stations
Railway stations in Metro Manila
Railway stations opened in 2009
Buildings and structures in Sampaloc, Manila